Wakanoumi Masateru II (born Akio Matsuda; October 25, 1945 – March 31, 1995) was a sumo wrestler from Ōhasama, Iwate, Japan.

Career
He made his professional debut in May 1961 and was given ex-komusubi Wakanoumi's old shikona when he was promoted to jūryō. However, he had an inauspicious jūryō debut, winning only two of his fifteen matches. After briefly returning to his family name of Matsuda he earned four consecutive winning record in the makushita division to return to jūryō in November 1971. He won the jūryō division yūshō or championship in May 1972 with a 12–3 record. He reached the top makuuchi division in July 1972, after 11 years and two months in sumo and 67 tournaments after his professional debut.  His highest rank was maegashira 2. He never managed double-digit wins in a top division tournament, and did not earn any special prizes or gold stars. However, he did defeat ōzeki Takanohana in March 1974. After suffering a dislocated ankle in the summer tour of 1977 he missed the September 1977 tournament and was demoted back to jūryō.

Retirement from sumo
Upon retirement from active competition in January 1978 he became an elder in the Japan Sumo Association under the name Ōtake and worked at Taihō stable (the Ōtake name was owned by Taihō).  He left the Sumo Association in May 1992, when the Ōtake elder stock was needed by the retiring Ōzutsu. After leaving sumo he ran a chankonabe restaurant in Tokyo's Kōtō ward and in 1993 appeared semi-regularly as a sumo trainer in the Hirari daytime drama series featured on NHK's Asadora. He died of heart failure in a Shibuya hospital on March 31, 1995 at the age of 49. He is buried in a temple in Hanamaki, Iwate.

Family
Two of his sons were sumo wrestlers - former makushita Kachimori (born 1977) of Isenoumi stable and former jonidan Wakashoho (born 1980) of the Taiho stable. Kachimori now runs a chanko bowl restaurant.

Fighting style
He was a yotsu-sumo wrestler, and his most common winning techniques were yori-kiri (force out), uwatenage (overarm throw) and tsuri-dashi (lift out).  He preferred a hidari-yotsu (right hand outside, left hand inside) grip on his opponent's mawashi.

Career record

See also
Glossary of sumo terms
List of past sumo wrestlers
List of sumo tournament second division champions

References

1945 births
Japanese sumo wrestlers
Sumo people from Iwate Prefecture
1995 deaths